Pedro Vaz is a settlement in the northeast of the island of Maio in Cape Verde. It is located 3.5 km north of Alcatraz and 16 km northeast of the island capital Porto Inglês.

See also
List of villages and settlements in Cape Verde

References
 

Villages and settlements in Maio, Cape Verde